John Dennys (died 1609), a poet and fisherman, pioneered Angling poetry in England. His only work The Secrets of Angling was the earliest English poetical treatise on fishing. John Dennys may have been an acquaintance of Shakespeare.

Early life
John Dennys was son of Hugh Dennis (died 1559) of "Plucherchurch" and Katherine, daughter of Thomas Trye of Hardwicke, Gloucestershire. Hugh's father John had been the heir of Hugh Denys of Osterley, Middlesex (died 1511), Groom of the Stool to Henry VII. John's elder brother Henry, died without having fathered any children.

The Secrets of Angling

His only work The Secrets of Angling was the earliest English poetical treatise on fishing. In it he wrote of a brook, River Boyd, formed from streams in his hometown of Pucklechurch, which met downstream with the River Avon:

And thou, sweet Boyd, that with thy watry sway,
Dost wash the cliffs of Deignton and of Weeke;
And through their Rockes with crooked winding way,
Thy mother Avon runnest soft to seeke;
In whose fayre streames the speckled Trout doth play.

It was first published in 1613. Dennys's book was published after his death, the author identified by the initials J.D., and had been attributed to up to 6 poets. In 1811 the authorship was determined from Stationers' Registers, which showed that Dennys authored the book.

A didactic pastoral poem in 3 books, totalling 151 verses each of 8 lines, in the style of Virgil's Georgics, it was published in 4 editions until 1652, examples of which are amongst the rarest books in existence. Verses from the book have been quoted in other works, such as Izaak Walton in the first part of the first chapter of his 1653 edition of The Compleat Angler.

Dennys received at the hand of Thomas Westwood (1814–1888), the epithet "The Fisherman's Glorious John". The appellation was received from Walter Scott.

Marriage and children
He married Eleanor, daughter of Thomas Millett of Warwickshire and had the following children:
Henry (born 1594), High Sheriff of Gloucestershire (1629), died on 26 June 1638 and may also have been buried the same day at Pucklechurch.
William, born 1596 and baptised 18 April 1596 buried at Pucklechurch 1652.
Cicely or Cecelia, born 1596 and baptised 18 April 1596, married William Guise, Esquire of Elmore and Sheriff of Gloucester in 1647.
Katherine, born 1599 and baptised 9 April 1599

Between 1572 and 1608, he was the lord of the manor at Oldbury-sur-Montem, Pucklechurch, Glocestershire. He had other places in the same county.

Acquaintanceship with Shakespeare
Rev. Henry Nicholson Ellacombe wrote Shakespeare as an Angler, in which he argues that The Bard and John Dennys (Dennis) may have known each other. William Shakespeare lived for a while at Dursley, not too far from Dennys's manor of Oldbury-on-Hill, north of Pucklechurch.

Death and epitaph
He died 30 July 1609 and was buried 7 August 1609 at the ancient Pucklechurch, The family was buried in the Pucklechurch's "ancient" church on the north aisle. John Dennys's will was dated 1609, without month, proved 14th. Oct. 1609.

Thomas Westwood wrote the following epitaph for John Dennys:
Calm be his sleep in the old aisle of Pucklechurch! or if any sound reach him from the outer world, may it be only the soughing of the sweet south wind, and the ripple of Boyd, that with "crooked  winding way" past cliff and meadow, "Its mother Avon runneth soft to seek".

Notes

References

Sources
 Oxford Dictionary of National Biography.

17th-century English poets
17th-century English male writers
17th-century English writers
Didactic poets
Bucolic poets
16th-century English poets
Angling writers
John
Year of birth missing
16th-century births
1609 deaths
English male poets
People from Pucklechurch